Alectinib (INN,), sold under the brand name Alecensa, is a medication that is used to treat non-small-cell lung cancer (NSCLC). It blocks the activity of anaplastic lymphoma kinase (ALK). It is taken by mouth. It was developed by Chugai Pharmaceutical Co. Japan, which is part of the Hoffmann-La Roche group.

History, clinical trials, Approvals and medical uses
Alectinib was approved in Japan in July 2014, for the treatment of ALK fusion-gene positive, unresectable, advanced or recurrent non-small-cell lung cancer (NSCLC).

It was granted an accelerated approval by the US Food and Drug Administration (FDA) in December 2015, to treat people with advanced ALK-positive NSCLC whose disease worsened after, or who could not tolerate, treatment with crizotinib (Xalkori).

It received conditional approval by the European Medicines Agency in February 2017, for the same indication.

The approvals were based mainly on two trials: In a Japanese Phase I–II trial, after approximately 2 years, 19.6% of patients had achieved a complete response, and the 2-year progression-free survival rate was 76%. In February 2016 the J-ALEX phase III study comparing alectinib with crizotinib was terminated early because an interim analysis showed that progression-free survival was longer with alectinib.

In November 2017, the FDA approved alectinib for the first-line treatment of people with ALK-positive metastatic non-small cell lung cancer. This based on the phase 3 ALEX trial comparing it with crizotinib.

Contraindications
There are no reported contraindications.

Side effects
Apart from unspecific gastrointestinal effects such as constipation (in 34% of patients) and nausea (22%), common adverse effects in studies included oedema (swelling; 34%), myalgia (muscle pain; 31%), anaemia (low red blood cell count), sight disorders, light sensitivity and rashes (all below 20%). Serious side effects occurred in 19% of patients; fatal ones in 2.8%.

Interactions 

Alectinib has a low potential for interactions. While it is metabolised by the liver enzyme CYP3A4, and blockers of this enzyme accordingly increase its concentrations in the body, they also decrease concentrations of the active metabolite M4, resulting in only a small overall effect. Conversely, CYP3A4 inducers decrease alectinib concentrations and increase M4 concentrations. Interactions via other CYP enzymes and transporter proteins cannot be excluded but are unlikely to be of clinical significance.

Pharmacology

Mechanism of action
The substance potently and selectively blocks two receptor tyrosine kinase enzymes: anaplastic lymphoma kinase (ALK) and the RET proto-oncogene. The active metabolite M4 has similar activity against ALK. Inhibition of ALK subsequently blocks cell signalling pathways, including STAT3 and the PI3K/AKT/mTOR pathway, and induces death (apoptosis) of tumour cells.

Pharmacokinetics

When taken with a meal, the absolute bioavailability of the drug is 37%, and highest blood plasma concentrations are reached after four to six hours. Steady state conditions are reached within seven days. Plasma protein binding of alectinib and M4 is over 99%. The enzyme mainly responsible for alectinib metabolism is CYP3A4; other CYP enzymes and aldehyde dehydrogenases only play a small role. Alectinib and M4 account for 76% of the circulating substance, while the rest are minor metabolites.

Plasma half-life of alectinib is 32.5 hours, and that of M4 is 30.7 hours. 98% are excreted via the faeces, of which 84% are unchanged alectinib and 6% are M4. Less than 1% are found in the urine.

Chemistry
Alectinib has a pKa of 7.05. It is used in form of the hydrochloride, which is a white to yellow-white lumpy powder.

References

External links 
 

Breakthrough therapy
Hoffmann-La Roche brands
Genentech brands
Carbazoles
Ketones
4-Morpholinyl compunds
Nitriles
Piperidines
Receptor tyrosine kinase inhibitors